Robert Johnson (born June 20, 1980) is a former American football tight end.

Early life and college
Born in Montgomery, Alabama, Johnson graduated from Jefferson Davis High School of Montgomery in 1999 and attended the Hargrave Military Academy for one year after graduating high school. He then attended Auburn University and played on the Auburn Tigers football team from 2000 to 2002. After his junior year, Johnson declared for the 2003 NFL Draft.

Professional career

Johnson signed as an undrafted free agent with the Chicago Bears in 2003. He left the Bears to join the Washington Redskins with whom he spent only one season before being released in August 2006. Johnson subsequently signed with the New Orleans Saints organization.

References

External links

1980 births
Living people
American football tight ends
Auburn Tigers football players
Chicago Bears players
Washington Redskins players
Players of American football from Montgomery, Alabama
Hargrave Military Academy alumni